St Keyne is a village in the civil parish of St Keyne and Trewidland, in east Cornwall, England, United Kingdom. The parish lies between the parishes of Liskeard and Duloe. The parish population at the 2011 census was 492.

The village is served by a railway station known as St Keyne Wishing Well Halt.

Notable buildings
The church is dedicated to Saint Keyne, said to be one of the daughters of the legendary Welsh King Brychan. The church is of little architectural interest. The Perpendicular north aisle has probably been added to a church originally cruciform in plan (its windows however are Decorated, no doubt reused). The west tower is of three storeys and without buttresses.

A small housing was built over the well in the 16th century, this was rebuilt in the 1930s. The ballad The Well of St Keyne was written by the poet Robert Southey (1774–1843). In Victorian times St Keyne's well had the reputation of conferring supremacy to the marriage partner who first tasted it. ("The quality, that man and wife / Whose chance, or choice, attaines / First of this sacred stream to drinke / Thereby the mastery gains.")

Civil parish
In 2020 Cornwall Council announced that from 1 April 2021 the part of Dobwalls and Trewidland parish surrounding the village of Trewidland would be moved to the parish of St Keyne, to form the new parish of St Keyne and Trewidland, increasing the area of the parish including St Keyne by more than a factor of three.

References

External links

 Cornwall Record Office Online Catalogue for St Keyne
 St Keyne Parish Council

Villages in Cornwall
Holy wells in Cornwall